This is a list of lists of airlines of Asia's countries and regions.

Asia

Afghanistan

Bahrain

Bangladesh

Bhutan

Brunei

Cambodia

China

Hong Kong

Macau

India

Indonesia

Iran

Iraq

Israel

Japan

Jordan

Kazakhstan

Kuwait

Kyrgyzstan

Laos

Lebanon

Malaysia

Maldives

Mongolia

Myanmar

Nepal

North Korea
Air Koryo

Oman

Pakistan

Palestine

Philippines

Qatar

Saudi Arabia

Singapore

South Korea

Sri Lanka

Syria

Taiwan

Tajikistan

Thailand

Timor-Leste

Turkmenistan

United Arab Emirates

Uzbekistan

Vietnam

Yemen

See also
 List of airlines
 List of defunct airlines of Asia

Due to the size of the list it has been broken down into: